Hefei No. 8 High School, commonly referred to as Hefei Bazhong, is a public high school in Hefei, Anhui, China.

Notable alumni 
Li Keqiang, the Premier of the State Council of the People's Republic of China
Miao Wei, the Minister of the Ministry of Industry and Information Technology
Yang Zhi, fantasy writer and novelist
Xie Nan, TV presenter and singer
Li Yapeng, actor

References

External links 
 School website (Chinese)

Education in Hefei
High schools in Anhui
Senior secondary schools in China
Educational institutions established in 1956
1956 establishments in China